Las Cruces Catholic School is a private, Roman Catholic PreK, Elementary, and middle school in Las Cruces, New Mexico. It was established in 1927.  It is located within the Roman Catholic Diocese of Las Cruces. It is an affiliate member of the NMAA.

Notes and references

Catholic secondary schools in New Mexico
Educational institutions established in 1927
St. Mary's High School (Las Cruces)
Buildings and structures in Las Cruces, New Mexico
1927 establishments in New Mexico